Khabarnaak (Urdu/Punjabi :خبرناک) is an Urdu and Punjabi comedy television show hosted by Ayesha Jahanzeb alongside Mir Mohammad Ali With Replace Irshad Bhatti Journalist that airs on GEO News.

Concept
The news series, which is styled after TV news talk shows, focuses on the satirical discussion of politics, current affairs, and society's problems, typically in the Punjabi language. Mir Mohammad Ali dresses up as a celebrity and Ayesha Jahanzeb as the presenter and co-host, while several comedians add comments and analysis. It used to feature a section "Zabaan o Bayaan" where host Ayesha Jahanzaib corrects the wrong use of the Urdu language that is common among the people. Sajjid Bhai guesses the composer, lyricists, and actors by listening to songs which are suggested by the hosts as well as the audience. Cartoonist Imran Bobby depicts political scenarios through his cartoons.

Cast

Main 
 Aftab Iqbal (Host)
 Sakhawat Naz as Jeda Driver
 Amanullah as Hakeem Sahab
 Nasir Chinyoti
 Naseem Vicky

Recurring 
 Mir Mohammad Ali as various celebrities' mimic
 Honey Albela as himself
 Saleem Albela as himself
 Iftikhar Thakur
 Sumbul Shahid as herself
 Agha Majid as Aaroo Grenade
 Rubi Anam as Sadak
 Naseer Bhai as himself
 Wajid Khan as himself and various characters
 Goga Ji as himself and various characters
 Farhat Abbas Shah as Master jee
 Sophia Mirza (Co-Host)
 Zainab Jamil (Co-Host)
 Lucky Dear as himself and various characters
 Majid Jahangir
 Abid Farooq as Baghi
 Abid Kashmiri
 Akram Udas
 Ayub Mirza as himself
 Naeem Bokhari (Host)
 Jugnu Mohsin (Host)
 Ayesha Jahanzeb (Host)
 Hassan Murad as himself and various characters
 Waseem Punu as himself and various characters
 Nadeem Baral as himself and various characters
 Imtiaz Kokab
 Asghar Yazdani
 Naeem Baloch
 Sherry Nanha
 Zeeshan Haider
 Rizma
 Zunaira Maham
 Javed Kodu
 Irshad Bhatti (Host)

Special episodes
 Eid Episodes - Usually, on the occasion of Eid al-Fitr, Ali dresses up as Aftab Iqbal and hosts a portion of the show while parodying Aftab. There are also Eid episodes Eid al-Fitr, Eid al-Adha.
 Valentine's Day - Usually, on Valentine's Day, an episode of 2 hours is broadcast live which includes live calls to challenge Naseer Bhai
 New Year's Day celebration - On every new year eve, a special episode is aired on Geo News channel from Aftab Iqbal's farmhouse from Okara.
 Imran Khan special - Chairman Pakistan Tehrik-e-Insaf Imran Khan was interviewed during this episode.
 Imran Khan's former wife Reham Khan appeared on one episode but Geo TV decided not to air this episode.
 6 September every year (Defence Day) is celebrated in Pakistan and Khabarnaak does a special show for it.
 Pakistan Cricket Team opening batsman, Mohammad Hafeez - Pakistan's star opener Mohammad Hafeez appears as guest in Khabarnaak
 Boxer Aamir Khan - Pakistan famous boxer Aamir Khan appears as a guest in Khabarnaak and is challenged by Bad Weather
 Army Public School attack - Army Public School attack, Peshwar. A Special program by Khabarnaak

Khabarnaak has often done parodies or mimicries of well-known Pakistani public personalities like Sheikh Rasheed Ahmad, Rehman Malik, Tariq Aziz (TV personality), Shahbaz Sharif, Anwar Maqsood and pop artist Ali Azmat.

History
Aftab Iqbal used to host the show Hasb-e-Haal starting in January 2009 – 2010. He left this show in April 2010. Due to his fall out with Hasb-e-Haal producers, Aftab surprised viewers by showing up on GEO TV show Choraha. The first episode of Khabarnaak was aired on 11 September 2010 with Eid celebration on that day. The first episode's cast included popular stage artists like Naseem Vicky, Nasir Chinyoti and Badr Khan along with Amanullah Khan (Hakeem Sahab) and Sakhawat Naz (Jeeda driver). Later, Sakhawat Naz and Amnullah Khan became the regular cast and they were joined by Honey and Saleem Albela in 2011. Iftikhar Thakur joined the show just before the 2013 General Elections.

In another surprise break-up, Amanullah Khan, Sakhawat Naz and Iftikhar Thakur left the show in August 2013 due to undisclosed reasons and started appearing on Dunya TV in the program Mazaaq Raat.  Sakhawat Naz and Amanullah Khan were part of the show since its inception.  In place of this trio, Agha Majid a.k.a. Aroo Grenade (who had earlier appeared on a few episodes), Rubi Anum (Sadiq), Wajid Khan and Farhat Abbas Shah (Master jee) were added to the regular cast. Lucky Dear, Majid Jehangir, Abid Farooq and Akram Udaas also appear on some shows.

In May 2014, Aftab Iqbal had a falling out with GEO administration and left the show. Parody star Mir Mohammad Ali took over as the host. After a period of 2–3 weeks, Iqbal re-joined Geo News and started hosting the show again.

As of August 2015, Aftab Iqbal left the show (last show aired 25 July 2015). Mir Muhammad Ali hosted the show for a week before Naeem Bokhari was hired as Iqbal's permanent replacement. With Iqbal, cast members Agha Majid, Rubi Anam and Honey Albela also left the show. Iqbal started hosting the show Khabardaar on Express News. They were replaced by Hasan Murad, Sherry Nanna, Saba Gul and Lucky Dear.

 Majid returned to the show in January 2017.

In 2016, Naeem Bokhari was replaced by Ayesha Jahanzeb as host. Reham Khan, former wife of Imran Khan did one episode but Geo TV management decided not to air this episode. Jugnu Mohsin replaced Jahanzeb in May 2017 for a few episodes after which Jahanzeb returned to host the show.

Segments of the show
 Segment No. 1:- Mir Mohammad Ali appears as a parody of a public figure and does comedy. Sometimes Saleem Albela, Wajid Khan or Hassan Murad also appear as a parody of public figures in Pakistan
 Segment No. 2:- Ayesha Jahanzaib gives very useful advice to the people sitting in the studio and those who are watching the program on TV.
 Segment No. 3:- Song segment. Famous Singer Khalid Baig sings a song with his soulful Voice
 Segment No. 4:- Khabar program Zunaira (Co-Host Khabarnaak) reads the news and the comedians comments/comedy at that news.

References

External links
Khabarnaak show on YouTube - 29 March 2018

Geo News
Urdu-language television shows
Punjabi-language television shows
Pakistani television series
2010 Pakistani television series debuts
Pakistani comedy television series